The men's 3000 metres steeplechase event at the 1960 Olympic Games took place between September 1 and September 3.

Results

Heats

The fastest three steeplechasers in each of the three heats advanced to the final round.

Heat one

Heat two

Heat three

Final

Key: OR = Olympic record; DNF = did not finish

References

M
Steeplechase at the Olympics
Men's events at the 1960 Summer Olympics